FC Ihroservice Simferopol was a Ukrainian football team based in Simferopol, Ukraine. Uniform colours are white shirts and blue shorts.

History
FC Ihroservis traces its heritage to FC Dynamo Simferopol (part of the Dynamo sports society) that was created in 1936 and participated in the Soviet football competitions until the late 1950s when it was dissolved.

In 2000 the football expert Mikhail Sachko and the businessman Nikolai Pashkulsk decided to recreate Dynamo club in place of the already existing FC Pishchevyk (Kharchovyk) Simferopol. In July 2001 the new Dynamo Simferopol joined the professional ranks of the Ukrainian competitions in the Ukrainian Second League. There is no direct connection exists between the Soviet Dynamo of the 1930s and the Ukrainian Dynamo of the 2000s as the original club dissolved in 1950s and the Soviet Dynamo society does not exist since 1992. The city of Simferopol does have a history of housing a football "team of masters" which is the only connection between the Soviet and the Ukrainian clubs.

Ihroservis played in Fiolent Stadium that seats 5000. The club was recently renamed in 2007 from FC Dynamo-Ihroservice to FC Ihroservice.
After the 2008–09 season the club failed to pay license fees for the next season and the PFL withdrew their professional status.

Sponsors
IgroService (gambling equipment manufacturer), Lazurnyi Bereg (real-estate company), Blockpost (regional security company), and others.

Honors

Ukrainian Second League (3rd Tier)
  2003/04 (Gr. B)

Crimea championship (Soviet Lower Tier)
  1939, 1940, 1947

League and cup history (Ukraine)

{|class="wikitable"
|-bgcolor="#efefef"
! Season
! Div.
! Pos.
! Pl.
! W
! D
! L
! GS
! GA
! P
!Domestic Cup
!colspan=2|Europe
!Notes
|- bgcolor=PowderBlue
|align=center|2001–02
|align=center|3rd "B"
|align=center bgcolor=tan|3
|align=center|34
|align=center|16
|align=center|12
|align=center|6
|align=center|33
|align=center|38
|align=center|41
|align=center|Did not enter
|align=center|
|align=center|
|align=center|
|- bgcolor=PowderBlue
|align=center|2002–03
|align=center|3rd "B"
|align=center bgcolor=silver|2
|align=center|30
|align=center|18
|align=center|7
|align=center|5
|align=center|53
|align=center|27
|align=center|61
|align=center|1/32 finals
|align=center|
|align=center|
|align=center|
|- bgcolor=PowderBlue
|align=center|2003–04
|align=center|3rd "B"
|align=center bgcolor=gold|1
|align=center|30
|align=center|24
|align=center|3
|align=center|3
|align=center|60
|align=center|24
|align=center|75
|align=center|1/32 finals
|align=center|
|align=center|
|align=center bgcolor=lightgreen|Promoted
|- bgcolor=LightCyan
|align=center|2004–05
|align=center|2nd
|align=center|14
|align=center|34
|align=center|12
|align=center|5
|align=center|17
|align=center|38
|align=center|57
|align=center|41
|align=center|1/16 finals
|align=center|
|align=center|
|align=center|
|- bgcolor=LightCyan
|align=center|2005–06
|align=center|2nd
|align=center|13
|align=center|34
|align=center|10
|align=center|8
|align=center|16
|align=center|40
|align=center|51
|align=center|38
|align=center|1/32 finals
|align=center|
|align=center|
|align=center|
|- bgcolor=LightCyan
|align=center|2006–07
|align=center|2nd
|align=center|10
|align=center|36
|align=center|14
|align=center|9
|align=center|13
|align=center|46
|align=center|44
|align=center|51
|align=center|1/16 finals
|align=center|
|align=center|
|align=center|
|- bgcolor=LightCyan
|align=center|2007–08
|align=center|2nd
|align=center|6
|align=center|38
|align=center|18
|align=center|6
|align=center|14
|align=center|50
|align=center|45
|align=center|60
|align=center|1/8 finals
|align=center|
|align=center|
|align=center|
|- bgcolor=LightCyan
|align=center|2008–09
|align=center|2nd
|align=center|11
|align=center|32
|align=center|12
|align=center|6
|align=center|14
|align=center|42
|align=center|47
|align=center|42
|align=center|1/16 finals
|align=center|
|align=center|
|align=center bgcolor=lightgrey|Withdraw
|}

References

External links
  Official team site
  mentioning of the head coach

 
Defunct football clubs in Simferopol
Association football clubs established in 1936
Association football clubs disestablished in 2009
1936 establishments in Ukraine
2009 disestablishments in Ukraine